Gary Robert Farquhar (born 23 February 1971 in Wick) is a part-time professional footballer who is currently assistant manager at Clachnacuddin in the Scottish Highland Football League.

References

1971 births
Living people
People from Wick, Caithness
Association football midfielders
Scottish footballers
St Johnstone F.C. players
Inverness Caledonian Thistle F.C. players
Scottish Football League players
Sportspeople from Highland (council area)
Wick Academy F.C. players
Brora Rangers F.C. players
Highland Football League players
Fort William F.C. players
Rothes F.C. players
Inverness City F.C. players